"Lose Somebody" is a song by Norwegian DJ Kygo and American band OneRepublic. It was released through Sony Music on 15 May 2020 as the fifth single from Kygo's third studio album Golden Hour. The song was written by Kyrre Gørvell-Dahll, Philip Plested, Ryan Tedder, Jacob Torrey, Morten Ristorp, Alexander Delicata and Alysa Vanderheym. The song was also included on the deluxe edition of OneRepublic's fifth studio album Human (2021).

Personnel
Credits adapted from Tidal.
 Kyrre Gørvell-Dahll – producer, composer, lyricist, associated performer
 Alexander Delicata – composer, lyricist, co-producer, guitar
 Alysa Vanderheym – composer, lyricist, co-producer
 Jacob Torrey – composer, lyricist
 Morten Ristorp – composer, lyricist, co-producer, piano
 Philip Plested – composer, lyricist
 Ryan Tedder – composer, lyricist
 OneRepublic – associated performer
 Tyler Spry – associated performer, guitar
 John Nathaniel – co-producer
 Myles Sheer – executive producer
 Randy Merrill – mastering engineer
 Serban Ghenea – mixing engineer
 Brent Kutzle – programmer

Charts

Weekly charts

Year-end charts

Certifications

Release history

References

2020 singles
2020 songs
Kygo songs
OneRepublic songs
Song recordings produced by Kygo
Songs written by Kygo
Songs written by Morten Ristorp
Songs written by Ryan Tedder